Round Copse is a   Local Nature Reserve in Reading in Berkshire. It is owned and managed by Reading Borough Council.

Geography and site

Round Copse is a small woodland, and is contiguous with another local nature reserve called McIlroy Park.

History

The site was designated a local nature reserve in 2002.

Fauna

The site has the following fauna:

Birds

European green woodpecker
Eurasian nuthatch
Great spotted woodpecker
Lesser spotted woodpecker
Eurasian treecreeper
Common blackbird

Flora

The site has the following flora:

Trees

Hazel

References

Parks and open spaces in Reading, Berkshire
Nature reserves in Berkshire
Local Nature Reserves in Berkshire